Rajendra Jawaharlal Darda is the Editor-in-Chief of Lokmat Media Group, a well-known author and social worker. He was a three-time Member of the Maharashtra Legislative Assembly from Aurangabad, Maharashtra. He was a Cabinet Minister for Education and Minister of Industries in the government of Maharashtra.

Education
After graduating from Nagpur University, Darda received his diploma from the Government Institute of Printing Technology, Mumbai. Darda also attended a two-year advanced course in Graphic Arts from the London College of Printing.

Career
Darda is editor-in-chief of the Lokmat newspaper group.
Darda had also taught journalism courses at Nagpur University.

Art and literature

Rajendra Darda published his first Marathi book "Zumbar", a travelogue narrating his experiences as a student in Europe and America in the 1970s. He has also penned a book "Vibrant Vignettes" in English. In the book "Aamche Vidyapeeth" eminent journalists threw light on his contribution to journalism. He has authored a number of articles on a variety of issues and personalities. He is an expert in graphic arts and has completed two-year Advanced Course in Graphic Arts from London College of Printing.

Awards
He received the Acharya Atre award of Sawaj Vyaspeeth from noted cartoonist late R K Laxman on February 15, 2000 for excellence in the field of journalism.

Social service
Mr. Darda has always been committed to the cause of social justice, health and environment. In 1984, he mobilized relief funds for the flood-affected people of Nanded and Parbhani and constructed school buildings. After the severe earthquakes of Bihar (1988) and Killari (Latur, Marathwada 1993), he made a significant contribution through Lokmat Relief Fund towards giving relief to the affected people. Under his leadership, the Lokmat Group of Newspapers raised Kargil relief fund for the families of the martyrs and
constructed hostels for the children of the martyrs at Aurangabad, Nagpur, Latur and Solapur.

Politics
In 1999, he was elected a Member of the Legislative Assembly (MLA) from Aurangabad Assembly Constituency, Maharashtra. Darda became the Minister of State for Energy, Finance and Planning, and later the Minister of State for Home. He was re-elected MLA from Aurangabad (West) Constituency in 2004 and Aurangabad (East) Constituency in 2009. He became the Minister for Industries in the newly constituted Cabinet of Maharashtra Government in November 2009 and later served as the School Education Minister.

Personal life
Darda has two sons Karan and Rishi, and a brother Vijay Jawaharlal Darda who is Chairman of Lokmat and has served 3 times as an MP.
He is married to Ashoo Darda, who is the chairperson of Lokmat Sakhi Manch.

References

External links
Chief Electoral Officer, Maharashtra, Detailed Candidates Affidavits of Assembly Election 2009
Maha News (marathi)  Introduction of Cabinet Ministers

People from Aurangabad, Maharashtra
Rajasthani people
Maharashtra MLAs 1999–2004
Maharashtra MLAs 2004–2009
Living people
1952 births
Maharashtra MLAs 2009–2014
Darda family